Jacques Hervet (born 25 February 1961) is a French tennis coach and former professional player.

Hervet featured as a qualifier in the singles main draw of the 1983 French Open, where he was beaten in the first round by former champion Ilie Năstase. He also competed in the mixed doubles event, as the partner of Dominique Beillan.

Challenger titles

Doubles: (1)

References

External links
 
 

1961 births
Living people
French male tennis players
Sportspeople from Oran
Pieds-Noirs